Early general elections were held in Thailand on 4 April 1976 after the House of Representatives had been dissolved prematurely on 12 January. A total of 2,350 candidates representing 39 parties contested the election, although voter turnout was only 44.0%. The result was a victory for the Democrat Party, which won 114 of the 279 seats.

Results

References

Thailand
1976 elections in Thailand
Elections in Thailand
Election and referendum articles with incomplete results